The Defense Innovation Unit (DIU) is a United States Department of Defense (DoD) organization founded to help the U.S. military make faster use of emerging commercial technologies. Launched in 2015, the organization has been called "the Pentagon's Innovation Experiment". DIU is staffed by civilian and both active duty and reserve military personnel. The organization is headquartered in Mountain View, California — Silicon Valley — with offices in Boston, Austin, Chicago, and the Pentagon just outside Washington, D.C.

Mission

The DIU's stated mission is to accelerate DoD adoption of commercial technology, transform military capacity and capability, and strengthen the American national security innovation base.

It seeks to strengthen US national security by accelerating the adoption of commercial technology throughout the military and growing the national security innovation base. DIU partners with organizations across the Department of Defense, from the services and components to combatant commands and defense agencies, to rapidly prototype and field advanced commercial products that address national security challenges.

DIU operates six portfolios dedicated to solving national security demand in areas of AI/ML (artificial intelligence/machine learning), Autonomy, Cyber, Human Systems, Energy, and Space. In 2016, DIU, then known as DIUx, pioneered a process called the 'Commercial Solutions Opening' (CSO) created by Lauren Dailey, David Rothzeid, and Robert Trejo along with a group of contracting officers from Army Contracting Command (ACC-NJ)  for awarding prototype contracts through the use of Other Transaction Authority (OTA) leveraging USC Title 10 §2371b for competitive selection of advanced commercial technologies. After a period of rapid prototyping, the resulting materiel can be transitioned and scaled through production OT (2371b(f)) agreements, or other follow-on contracts for units and organizations that find utility with the prototyping effort.

Leaders

DIU was launched in August 2015 as "Defense Innovation Unit Experimental (DIUx)." It was founded by Maynard Holliday. In May 2016, then-Secretary of Defense Ash Carter announced a reboot of the organization, designating that it report directly to his office.

From May 2016 to February 2018, its managing partner was Raj Shah, a Wharton MBA graduate who flew F-16s in Iraq as an Air National Guard reservist and co-founded Morta Security, later acquired by Palo Alto Networks.  Other leaders include Isaac Taylor, Chris Kirchhoff, Vishaal Hariprasad, and Ajay Amlani. Taylor spent 13 years at Google, designing and building its first self-driving cars, then later rising to operations director of Google X where he started projects involving robotics and augmented reality.  Kirchhoff served as a strategist in President Obama's National Security Council and as the civilian assistant to General Martin Dempsey, chairman of the Joint Chiefs of Staff.  Hariprasad is a highly decorated Air Force cyberwarfare officer who cofounded Morta Security with Raj Shah. Amlani is a former White House Fellow and cofounder of the airport security service CLEAR who co-led many of the autonomy and software initiatives of DIU.

In August 2017, during a period in which Captain Sean Heritage, USN, was interim Director, Deputy Secretary of Defense directed DIUx be re-designated as the Defense Innovation Unit (DIU) to indicate the organization's permanence within the Department of Defense.

On September 24, 2018, Michael Brown took over as DIU's Managing Director. In April 2021, Brown was originally going to be President Joe Biden's nominee for chief weapons buyer for the Department of Defense when news broke that he was under investigation by the Department of Defense Office of Inspector General over alleged breaches of federal hiring rules at the DIU. Brown withdrew his name from consideration shortly afterwards. Brown left his position as managing director on September 2, 2022. On September 9, 2022, the DoD Inspector General found the allegations to be unsubstantiated.

See also
Defense Innovation Advisory Board

References

https://www.washingtonpost.com/news/checkpoint/wp/2016/05/11/pentagon-chief-overhauls-silicon-valley-office-will-open-similar-unit-in-boston

External links

United States Department of Defense
2015 establishments in California
Companies based in Mountain View, California